Ahmet Furkan Tarhan is a businessman in Turkey. He is the chairman of the board of trustees for Üsküdar University and administrative director of the Npistanbul Neuropsychiatry Hospital. He is also board member of Union of Foundation Universities in Turkey (VUB).

References

External links 
 

1980 births
Living people
Turkish business executives
Turkish businesspeople